

Events

January events
 January – The Muskingum Electric Railroad, one of only six heavy freight electric railroads in the United States, closes.
 January 1 – The Bodensee–Toggenburg railway in Switzerland merges into the Südostbahn.
 January 2 – The Iowa Interstate Railroad operates its first unit coal train over the former Milwaukee Road mainline through Amana, Iowa.
 January 14 – The British Strategic Rail Authority unveils its 10-year strategic plan for the national railway network, including a £4.5bn investment in new trains, improved station facilities, track repair and signalling work.
 January 27 – St Albans railway line block signalling and electrification extended to Sydenham in Melbourne, Australia.

February events
 February –  Australia’s National Rail Corporation's freight operations and assets are combined with the Government of New South Wales' FreightCorp and sold to Toll Holdings and Patrick Corporation as Pacific National.
 February 8 – Changi Airport MRT station on the Singapore MRT System is opened, giving Singapore Changi Airport its first rail link in 21 years.

April events
 April – David L. Gunn is appointed to head Amtrak by President of the United States George W. Bush, and David Laney joins the Amtrak Board of Directors.
 April 4 – General Motors Electro-Motive Division and Porterbrook are awarded a contract to build new diesel locomotives for the first open access rail freight carrier in Belgium.
 April 14 – Opening of KLIA Ekspres from Kuala Lumpur Sentral railway station to Kuala Lumpur International Airport in Malaysia.
 April 17 – Robert Krebs resigns as chairman of the board of directors for the Burlington Northern and Santa Fe Railway, and is replaced by company CEO Matthew K. Rose.
 April 29 – The first Class 390 Pendolino, operated by Virgin Trains West Coast in the UK, arrives at Euston station in London.

May events
 May – The Metrolink 91 Line opens for service between Los Angeles and Riverside, California.

June events
 June - The NSW 86 class electric locomotives are retired from regular service.
 June 12 – The Talgo XXI trainset sets the land speed record for railed vehicles with diesel power at 256.38 km/h (159.3 mph).

July events
 July 1
 Norges Statsbaner is privatised under the Norwegian Ministry of Transport and Communications.
 The railroad dining car catering services of Mitropa, which was founded in 1916, are handed over to DB Reise & Touristik, a subsidiary of Deutsche Bahn.
 July 4 – General Motors Electro-Motive Division announces that it will build new locomotives for HSBC Rail; the locomotives will be leased by CargoNet for use in Norway north of the Arctic Circle and are expected to enter service after February 2003.
 July 26 – The German manufacturer of rail equipment, Vossloh, announces the acquisition of the French company Cogifer.
 July 30 – The Iowa, Chicago and Eastern Railroad takes over operations from the defunct I&M Rail Link in the north central United States.

August events
 August 1 – Deutsche Bahn opens the high-speed line between Frankfurt and Cologne, Germany.

September events

October events
 October 11 – The prototype AVE Class 102 train (later used by track authority ADIF as test train Class 330) reaches speeds of  during test runs.
 October 31 – BC Rail operates the last run of the Cariboo Prospector passenger train between Prince George and North Vancouver (city), British Columbia.

November events
 November 22 – The Toronto Transit Commission opens the Sheppard Subway, connecting the Sheppard-Yonge and Don Mills stations.
 November 23 – Expansion opens at Fremont-Centerville (Amtrak station).

December events
 December
 National Express hands back its M>Train, M>Tram and V/Line public transport franchises in Victoria, Australia to the Government of Victoria due to financial instability.
 The Tōhoku Shinkansen in Japan is extended from Morioka to Hachinohe.
 December 7 – First section of Porto Metro opens in Portugal.
 December 10 – Inauguration of Belgian High Speed Line 2 (HSL 2 – Leuven<>Ans) by Prince Philippe, Duke of Brabant.
 December 15 – All first-class cars on the TGV become non-smoking cars.
 December 24 – First line of the Delhi Metro is inaugurated in India.
 December 27 – The first X'Trapolis train enters service with Connex Melbourne, Australia.

Unknown date events

 Completion of 360 km of dual gauge track on Bangladesh Railway, improving connections between the previously isolated east and west networks and giving 1676 mm gauge access to Dhaka, the capital.

Accidents
 January 18 – The Minot train derailment occurred in Minot, North Dakota on when a Canadian Pacific Railway freight train derailed, spilling hazardous materials.
 February 6 – Charlotte's Dale train crash: collision of a commuter and a freight train near Durban in South Africa kills 24 people.
 February 20 – Al Ayyat train disaster at Reqa Al-Gharbiya in Egypt: a fire on a train running from Cairo to Luxor kills at least 383 and injures over 65.
 February 27 – Godhra train burning: 59 Hindu pilgrims die aboard the Sabarmati Express train burned by Muslim extremists at Godhra in the Indian state of Gujarat.
 May 2 – An eastbound Canadian National train collides with a trailer near Firmdale, Manitoba, Canada; about 20 cars carrying plastic pellets, benzene, glycol and hexane catch fire, forcing the evacuation of nearly 200 local residents.
 May 10 – The Potters Bar rail crash occurs at Potters Bar railway station, north of London, England, when a northbound West Anglia Great Northern Class 365 passenger train derails at high speed, killing seven and seriously injuring another eleven.
 May 13 – Jaunpur train crash: the Shramjivi Express, travelling from New Delhi to Patna, India, strikes a sabotaged section of rail and derails at Jaunpur, Uttar Pradesh, killing 12 people.
 May 25 – The Tenga rail disaster of May 2002 occurred at Tenga 40 km north-west from Maputo, Mozambique; there were 192 deaths with 167 injured.
 June 4 – The Kasganj level crossing disaster happened near the town of Kasganj in Uttar Pradesh, India. An express train collided with a bus, killing 49 people.
 June 24 – In the Igandu train disaster, a large passenger train in Tanzania with over 1,200 people on board rolls backwards down a hill into a stationary goods train, killing 281 people.
 September 10 – At least 130 people are killed in the Rafiganj train disaster in India, where a passenger train derails on a bridge and falls into a river. Naxalite sabotage is suspected.
 September 15 - A Norfolk Southern freight train derails in Farragut, Tennessee resulting in a hazardous materials release of fuming Sulfuric acid and evacuation of more than 2,600 nearby residents for nearly three days. Damage was estimated at just over one million USD.
 December 21 – The Kurnool train crash happened in Kurnool district in Andhra Pradesh, India, when a passenger train derailed, killing 20 people.

Awards

Japan
 Awards presented by Japan Railfan Club
 2002 Blue Ribbon Award: JR East E257 series Azusa / Kaiji EMU
 2002 Laurel Prize: JR West KiHa 187 series DMU

North America
2002 E. H. Harriman Awards

Awards presented by Railway Age magazine
 2002 Railroader of the Year: E. Hunter Harrison (BN, IC, CN)
 2002 Regional Railroad of the Year: Reading Blue Mountain and Northern Railroad
 2002 Short Line Railroad of the Year: Winchester and Western Railroad

United Kingdom
Train Operator of the Year
 2002:

References
Some of the events listed here were translated from 2002 dans les chemins de fer, the equivalent French-language Wikipedia article.